was a Japanese-Afghan physician.

Tetsu Nakamura may also refer to:

, Japanese actor and opera singer